The Hanover Park Regional High School District is a comprehensive regional public school district that serves students in ninth through twelfth grades from three communities in Morris County, New Jersey, United States. Students come from East Hanover Township, Florham Park and Hanover Township.

As of the 2020–21 school year, the district, comprised of two schools, had an enrollment of 1,452 students and 132.0 classroom teachers (on an FTE basis), for a student–teacher ratio of 11.0:1.

The district is classified by the New Jersey Department of Education as being in District Factor Group "GH", the third-highest of eight groupings. District Factor Groups organize districts statewide to allow comparison by common socioeconomic characteristics of the local districts. From lowest socioeconomic status to highest, the categories are A, B, CD, DE, FG, GH, I and J.

History
Students from East Hanover and Florham Park had been informed in 1952 by the Madison Public Schools that students from the two communities could not be accommodated at Madison High School after the 1954-55 school year.

Schools 
Schools in the district (with 2020–21 enrollment data from the National Center for Education Statistics) are:
 Hanover Park High School, which opened in 1956, serves the Township of East Hanover and the Borough of Florham Park. It had an enrollment of 801 in grades 9 through 12. The school is located in East Hanover Township.
 Whippany Park High School, whose doors opened in 1967, serves the Township of Hanover. The enrollment was 613 in grades 9 through 12. The school is located in the Whippany section of Hanover Township.

Administration
Core members of the district's administration are:
Maria Carrell, Superintendent
William F. Albert Jr., Business Administrator / Board Secretary

Board of education
The district's board of education, comprised of nine members, sets policy and oversees the fiscal and educational operation of the district through its administration. As a Type II school district, the board's trustees are elected directly by voters to serve three-year terms of office on a staggered basis, with three seats up for election each year held (since 2012) as part of the November general election. The board appoints a superintendent to oversee the district's day-to-day operations and a business administrator to supervise the business functions of the district. The seats on the board of education are allocated to the constituent municipalities based on their population, with East Hanover Township, Florham Park and Hanover Township each assigned three seats.

References

External links 
Hanover Park Regional High School District

School Data for the Hanover Park Regional High School District, National Center for Education Statistics

East Hanover Township, New Jersey
Florham Park, New Jersey
Hanover Township, New Jersey
New Jersey District Factor Group GH
School districts in Morris County, New Jersey